Hristina Vassileva-Zhecheva (born July 22, 1984) is a Bulgarian figure skating coach and choreographer in USA, and former competitor.  She is six time Bulgarian national champion and reached the free skate at four ISU Championships. She achieved her best result, 16th, at the 2001 European Championships.

Personal life
Hristina Vassileva was born on 22 July 1984 in Sofia, Bulgaria. She is the granddaughter of Dimitar Drazhev. Since her marriage to Vyacheslav Zhechev in 2010, her surname may also appear as Vassileva-Zhecheva. She has two daughters – Isabella (born 2012) and Sofia (born 2013). In July 2016, the family moved to Miami, Florida, United States for work.

Career
Vassileva was selected to represent Bulgaria at the 2000 World Junior Championships in Oberstdorf, Germany. Ranked 9th in qualifying group B, she advanced to the short program, where she placed 15th, allowing her to compete in the final segment. She placed 20th in the free skate and 19th overall.

In the 2000–01 season, Vassileva was named in Bulgaria's team to the 2001 European Championships in Bratislava, Slovakia. She placed 18th in the short and 15th in the free, resulting in a final placement of 16th. The 2001 World Junior Championships were held in Sofia, Bulgaria. Like a year earlier, Vassileva finished 19th overall, after placing 25th in the short program and 16th in the free. Concluding her season, she progressed past the qualifying round at the 2001 World Championship in Vancouver, British Columbia, Canada, but was eliminated after placing 27th in the short program.

Vassileva competed at the 2002 World Championships in Nagano, Japan but did not advance to the short program. She was coached by Ludmila Mladenova in Sofia until the end of the 2001–02 season.

In 2002–03, Vassileva trained under Rafael Arutyunyan in Los Angeles, as well as in Sofia. She was unable to reach the free skate at an ISU Championship, being eliminated after the short program at the 2003 European Championships in Malmö, Sweden, and after the qualifying round at the 2003 World Championships in Washington, D.C.

In 2003–04, Naiden Borichev began coaching Vassileva in Sofia, while continuing his competitive career in men's singles. Vassileva failed to progress out of her qualifying group at the 2004 World Championships in Dortmund, Germany.

By the 2010–11 season, Vassileva was being coached by Teodor Yotov in Sofia. She reached her fourth ISU Championship free skate at the 2011 European Championships in Bern, Switzerland. Ranked 20th in the short and 22nd in the free, she finished 23rd overall. In April 2011, she won the Bulgarian national title.

Vassileva made no competitive appearances because of maternity reasons during the following seasons until October 2015, when she returned and competed at the 2015 Denkova-Staviski Cup in Sofia. In December, she won another Bulgarian national title. She also competed at the 2015 CS Golden Spin of Zagreb, NRW Trophy, Sofia Trophy, and Sportland Trophy.

In 2016, Vassileva began training with Kent Johnson at Kendall Ice Arena in Miami, Florida. She also works as a coach at the rink.

In January 2017, Vassileva attended at European Figure Skating Championship in Ostrava, Czech Republic. At the championship she was the oldest skater with 32 years of age. Because of injury she didn't skate her best and after the competition she decided to retire after almost 29 years on the ice. Now she works successfully as a Figure Skating Coach.

Programs

Results
CS: Challenger Series; JGP: Junior Grand Prix

2004–05 to 2015–16

1997–98 to 2003–04

References

External links

 

Bulgarian female single skaters
Figure skaters at the 2007 Winter Universiade
1984 births
Living people
Figure skaters from Sofia